Willian Klaus (born 11 January 1994), commonly known as Klaus, is a Brazilian footballer who plays as a central defender for RWD Molenbeek.

Club career
Born in Dois Irmãos, Rio Grande do Sul, Klaus represented Grêmio, Internacional and Juventude as a youth. He made his senior debut with the latter on 12 March 2015, starting in a 0–1 Campeonato Gaúcho away loss against União Frederiquense.

Klaus became a regular starter during the 2016 campaign, as his side achieved promotion from the Série C and reached the quarterfinals of the Copa do Brasil. His first senior goal came on 21 April of that year, the second in a 2–0 home win against former club Grêmio.

On 19 January 2017, Klaus joined Internacional, recently relegated to Série B.

Career statistics

Honours
Ceará
Copa do Nordeste: 2020

References

External links
Juventude official profile 

1994 births
Living people
Sportspeople from Rio Grande do Sul
Brazilian footballers
Brazilian people of Austrian descent
Association football defenders
Campeonato Brasileiro Série A players
Campeonato Brasileiro Série B players
Campeonato Brasileiro Série C players
Esporte Clube Juventude players
Sport Club Internacional players
Ceará Sporting Club players
Botafogo de Futebol e Regatas players
Atlético Clube Goianiense players